The 1941 season was the Philadelphia Eagles' ninth in the National Football League (NFL). The team improved on their 1–10 record from the previous season, but just barely, winning two games, and they missed out on the playoffs again.

Offseason
After a year sharing Shibe Park with the Philadelphia Athletics and Philadelphia Phillies Major League Baseball teams in 1940, the Eagles returned to the larger Philadelphia Municipal Stadium they had used from 1936 to 1939.

In late 1940, Art Rooney, owner of the Pittsburgh Steelers (then known as the Pittsburgh Pirates), bought a 70 percent stake in the Eagles after selling the Pirates to New York entrepreneur Alexis Thompson. Thompson wanted to move the Pittsburgh franchise to Boston, but before the start of the 1941 season Rooney and Thompson agreed that their franchises would switch places, with Rooney moving the Eagles to Pittsburgh, where they would be renamed the Steelers, and Thompson moving the Pittsburgh team (whom he had renamed the Iron Men) to Philadelphia, where they would take up the Eagles name. The switch meant the rosters of both teams were made up of players who had played in the other city the previous season, though many were traded back before the start of the season.

NFL Draft
The 1941 NFL Draft was held on December 10, 1940. As the team with the worst record from the previous season, the Eagles had the first pick in all but the last two of the draft's 22 rounds. Because these players were drafted before the Eagles and Steelers swapped cities, these players ended up playing for the Pittsburgh Steelers in 1941. The Pittsburgh draft picks would come to Philadelphia, and vice versa, though five players originally picked by the original Eagles ended up being traded to the new Eagles franchise.

The Chicago Bears (From Philadelphia Eagles) had the number one pick in the draft. They choose Tom Harmon, the 1940 Heisman Trophy winner, a Halfback out of the University of Michigan

Player selections
The table shows the Eagles selections and what picks they had that were traded away and the team that ended up with that pick. It is possible the Eagles' pick ended up with this team via another team that the Eagles made a trade with. Not shown are acquired picks that the Eagles traded away. These picks were the players that the Pittsburgh Pirates made before the team swap between owners.

Regular season

Schedule

Game summaries
The Eagles played 11 games over an NFL season that was 14 weeks long. The season started on September 7 and ended on December 7.

Week 3: at Pittsburgh Steelers

The Eagles travel across the state of Pennsylvania to play the renamed Pittsburgh Steelers for the first time since the franchises swapped cities.

Week 7: vs Washington Redskins

The defending 1940 NFL Eastern Division Champions, Washington Redskins make a visit to Philadelphia to play the Eagles. Washington lost the 1940 NFL Championship Game to the Chicago Bears 73–0. The Eagles will host the Bears in week 12 and travel to Washington, D.C. to re-play the Redskins in week 14 to close out the 1941 season.

Week 10: vs Pittsburgh Steelers

The Eagles' cross-state rivals returned to Philadelphia for a rematch of the Week 3 game won by the Eagles. The Eagles entered the game with two wins, while the Steelers were winless.

Week 14: at Washington Redskins
At about the time this game was kicking off, the United States suffered an attack on Pearl Harbor, resulting in military personnel and US government officials receiving pages.

Standings

Roster
(All time List of Philadelphia Eagles players in franchise history)

The 1941 Philadelphia Eagles roster is made up of 39 players which 32 are rookies.

Honors and rewards
 Rookie end Dick Humbert finished second in receptions with 29 (league leader had 58), fourth in receiving yards with 332 (league leader had 738) and joint-fourth in receiving touchdowns with 3 (league leader had 10).
 Humbert was selected for the All-Star Game.

References

1941
Philadelphia Eagles
Philadelphia Eagles